The black guan (Chamaepetes unicolor) is a species of bird in the chachalaca, guan, and curassow family Cracidae. It is found in Costa Rica and Panama.

Taxonomy and systematics

The black guan shares the genus Chamaepetes with the sickle-winged guan (C. goudotii) of western South America and may form a superspecies with it.

Description

Adults have all black plumage with contrasting bright blue facial skin around a red eye. Their legs and feet are pinkish-red. Juveniles are similar but less glossy and their underparts browner and their facial skin is blackish or dark brown.

Distribution and habitat

The black guan is found from the Cordillera de Guanacaste in northern Costa Rica to western Coclé Province in Panama. It inhabits cloudforest in the Talamancan montane forest ecozone.

Behavior

Movement

The black guan is thought to be mainly sedentary but there is some evidence of seasonal elevation changes.

Feeding

The black guan forages singly, in pairs, or in small groups. Its primary diet is fruits; studies in Costa Rica have identified at least 35 different species eaten. It mostly feeds in trees but will also eat fallen fruit on the ground.

Breeding

The black guan's breeding season is believed to span from February to June. The clutch size is two or three eggs.

Vocal and non-vocal sounds

The black guan's vocalizations include piping calls in the breeding season, a "a low, deep 'ro-rooo' or coughing 'kowr' if disturbed", and a "tsik tsik..." alarm call. At dawn and dusk it gives a "loud, sharp, crackling" wing-rattling display.

Status

The IUCN has assessed the black guan as being of Least Concern. In Costa Rica it is fairly common in protected areas but in Panama only locally "rather numerous". However, even where nominally protected it is heavily hunted for food.

References

Further reading

External links

 
 
 

black guan
black guan
Birds of the Talamancan montane forests
black guan
black guan
Taxonomy articles created by Polbot